The 2002 SEC Championship Game was won by the Georgia Bulldogs 30–3 over the Arkansas Razorbacks. The game was played in the Georgia Dome in Atlanta, Georgia on December 7, 2002 and was televised to a national audience on CBS.

The 2002 championship game was unusual in the fact that team in first place in the Western Division did not play in the game. The Alabama Crimson Tide finished with the best SEC record in the Western Division, but could not participate in the conference championship game due to an NCAA probation stipulation which banned the team from any post season play. Instead, the Arkansas Razorbacks who finished in a three way tie for second represented the Western Division after winning the tie breaker over Auburn and LSU. This was not the first time the SEC West leader was excluded from the game. Auburn also finished atop the West in 1993, but was banned from post season play as well by NCAA probation.

References

SEC Championship Game
SEC Championship Game
Arkansas Razorbacks football games
Georgia Bulldogs football games
December 2002 sports events in the United States
2002 in sports in Georgia (U.S. state)
2002 in Atlanta